Buz  may refer to:

 Buz, Albania, a village in Memaliaj municipality, Gjirokastër County, Albania
 Buz, Iran, a village in Khuzestan Province, Iran
the nickname of William A. Brock (born 1941), American mathematical economist and professor
 Buz, son of Nahor, a minor Biblical character
Buz, an ancient tribe mentioned in Jeremiah 25:23
 the title character of Buz Sawyer, an American comic strip published from 1943 to 1989